The Sin of Rogelia Sanchez (Italian:Il peccato di Rogelia Sanchez) is a 1940 Italian drama film directed by Carlo Borghesio and Roberto de Ribón and starring Germaine Montero, Juan de Landa and Rafael Rivelles.

It was made at Cinecitta as part of an Italian-Spanish film agreement, with a separate Spanish-language version Saint Rogelia also been produced. It was based on a 1926 novel by Armando Palacio Valdés. The film's sets were designed by Guido Fiorini.

Cast

References

Bibliography 
 Philip Balma. Edith Bruck in the Mirror: Fictional Transitions and Cinematic Narratives. Purdue University Press, 2014.

External links 
 

1940 drama films
1940s multilingual films
Italian drama films
1940 films
1940s Italian-language films
Films directed by Carlo Borghesio
Italian multilingual films
Films scored by Giovanni Fusco
Italian black-and-white films
1940s Italian films